California's 6th State Assembly district is one of 80 California State Assembly districts. It is currently represented by Republican Kevin Kiley of Rocklin.

District profile 
The district encompasses an outer ring of northeastern Sacramento suburbs and commuter towns, as well as some adjacent rural communities. The district runs up against the Sierra Nevada to the east, with the urban core to the southwest and Sacramento Valley farmland to the west.

El Dorado County – 34.1%
 Cameron Park
 El Dorado Hills

Placer County – 77.5%
 Granite Bay
 Lincoln
 Loomis
 Penryn
 Rocklin
 Roseville
 Sheridan

Sacramento County – 9.7%
 Fair Oaks
 Folsom
 Orangevale

Election results from statewide races

List of Assembly Members 
Due to redistricting, the 6th district has been moved around different parts of the state. The current iteration resulted from the 2011 redistricting by the California Citizens Redistricting Commission.

Election results 1992–present

2020

2018

2016

2014

2012

2010

2008

2006

2004

2002

2000

1998

1996

1994

1992

See also 
 California State Assembly
 California State Assembly districts
 Districts in California

References

External links 
 District map from the California Citizens Redistricting Commission

06
Government of El Dorado County, California
Government of Placer County, California
Government of Sacramento County, California